Lanell Cofer (12 March 1948 – 18 October 2018) was an American politician and lawyer.

Cofer was born on 12 March 1948 and graduated from East Texas State University in 1971 before attending the Texas Southern University School of Law. After earning her Juris Doctor in 1974, she became an attorney based in Dallas.

After Eddie Bernice Johnson resigned the District 33-0 seat in the Texas House of Representatives, Cofer, a fellow Democrat and African-American, won a November 1977 special election to succeed Johnson, and took office on 8 December 1977. During her legislative tenure, Cofer remained a Dallas resident. After completing Johnson's term, Cofer won two full terms in her own right before stepping down on 11 January 1983. She died on 18 October 2018.

References

1948 births
2018 deaths
20th-century African-American women
21st-century African-American women
20th-century African-American politicians
African-American state legislators in Texas
African-American women lawyers
Women state legislators in Texas
Democratic Party members of the Texas House of Representatives
20th-century American politicians
African-American women in politics
Politicians from Dallas
Lawyers from Dallas
20th-century American women politicians
20th-century American women lawyers
Texas A&M University–Commerce alumni
Thurgood Marshall School of Law alumni
20th-century American lawyers